The 1961 International cricket season was from May 1961 to August 1961.

Season overview

June

Australia in England

South Africa in England

August

Denmark in Scotland

References

1961 in cricket